Aka Maruf Bami Khelis an administrative unit, known as Union council or Ward in Tehsil Babuzai, of Swat District in the Khyber Pakhtunkhwa province of Pakistan. Two clans of Babuzai namely Aka Maroof and Bami Khel live in the Union Council.

According to Khyber Pakhtunkhwa Local Government Act 2013. District Swat has 67 Wards, of which total number of Village Councils is 170, and Neighbourhood Councils is 44.

Aka Maruf Bami Khel is Territorial  Ward, which is further divided in four Village Councils:
 Bishbanr (Village Council)
 Kass (Village Council)
 Banjot (Village Council)
 Sar Sardarai (Village Council)

Shangla puran towa 
 Babuzai
 Manglawar
 Swat District

References

External links
 Khyber-Pakhtunkhwa Government website section on Lower Dir
 United Nations
 Hajjinfo.org Uploads
 PBS paiman.jsi.com 
 Neighbourhood Council

Swat District
Populated places in Swat District
Union Councils of Swat District